Tom Bellfort is a sound editor. He has done sound editing on over 80 films since 1983.

He was a member of The Saul Zaentz Film Center, Skywalker Sound, and Soundelux.

Filmography
Select titles Bellfort worked on at Skywalker Sound

The Young Indiana Jones Chronicles (TV Show and movies) - Supervising Sound Editor
The Terminator (remix) - Supervising Sound Editor
XXX: State of the Union - Supervising Sound Editor
Titanic - Supervising Sound Editor
Star Wars: Episode I – The Phantom Menace - Supervising Sound Editor
The Last Supper - Supervising Sound Editor
Volcano - Supervising Sound Editor
Frequency - Supervising Sound Editor
Hart's War - Supervising Sound Editor
The Recruit - Supervising Sound Editor

Oscar nominations
(Both are in Best Sound Editing)

70th Academy Awards- Titanic. Shared with Christopher Boyes. Won.
72nd Academy Awards-Nominated for Star Wars: Episode I – The Phantom Menace. Nomination shared with Ben Burtt. Lost to The Matrix.

References

External links

Sound editors
Best Sound Editing Academy Award winners
Date of birth missing (living people)
Living people
Emmy Award winners
Year of birth missing (living people)